Mariscal Nieto (Spanish mariscal marshal) is a Peruvian football club, playing in the city of Ilo, Moquegua, Peru.

History
Mariscal Nieto is of the clubs with greater tradition in the city of Ilo, Moquegua. 

The club was the 1985 departamental champion and played in the 1986 Torneo Descentralizado and 1991 Torneo Descentralizado.

Honours

Regional
Liga Departamental de Moquegua:
 Winners (8): 1980, 1984, 1987, 1989, 1994, 2001, 2002, 2014
 Runner-up (3): 2004, 2016, 2022

Liga Provincial de Ilo:
 Winners (8): 2002, 2004, 2010, 2014, 2016, 2018, 2019, 2022
 Runner-up (3): 2009, 2013, 2017

Liga Distrital de Ilo:
 Winners (12): 1979, 1980, 1984, 2001, 2009, 2010, 2013, 2014, 2016, 2017, 2018, 2022
 Runner-up (1): 2019

See also
List of football clubs in Peru
Peruvian football league system

External links
 1986 Peruvian Primera Division

Football clubs in Peru